Sir Stephen William Scott Cobb KC (born 12 April 1962), styled The Honourable Mr Justice Cobb, is a British High Court judge.

Career
Cobb is the son of Sir John Francis Scott Cobb, a judge in the Queen's Bench Division of the High Court. He was educated at Winchester College and the University of Liverpool. He was called to the bar at the Inner Temple in 1985. 

In 2003, he was appointed Queen's Counsel and in 2004 was appointed a Recorder. In December 2012, he was appointed a High Court judge with effect from 11 January 2013. He was assigned to the Family Division and received the customary knighthood in the 2013 Special Honours.

Cobb was the Chairman of the Family Law Bar Association for two years from 2010 to 2011. In 2012 he was awarded the Family Law QC (as it then was) of the year prize at the Jordan Publishing's Family Law Awards.

Notable judgments 
In 2015, sitting in the Court of Protection, he ruled that a woman with six children and an IQ of 70 should be sterilized because another pregnancy would be a "significantly life-threatening event" for her and the foetus due to her having a very thin uterus.

References

Notes

1962 births
Living people
People educated at Winchester College
Alumni of the University of Liverpool
Members of the Inner Temple
21st-century English judges
Family Division judges
Knights Bachelor